The Desperate Hours is a 1955 film noir starring Humphrey Bogart and Fredric March. It was produced and directed by William Wyler and based on the 1954 novel and 1955 play of the same name, written by Joseph Hayes, which were loosely built on actual events. The film takes place on the Northside of Indianapolis and took great pains to be accurate as to street names and locations within the city and Indiana in general.

The original Broadway production had actor Paul Newman in the Bogart role but he was passed over for the movie because Bogart was a much bigger star. The character of Glenn Griffin was made older in the script so Bogart could play the part. Bogart said he viewed the story as "Duke Mantee grown up." Spencer Tracy was originally cast as Daniel Hilliard. Although he and Bogart were very good friends, both insisted on top billing, and Tracy eventually withdrew from the picture. Fredric March replaced Tracy.

The Desperate Hours was the first black-and-white film in VistaVision, Paramount's wide-screen process. The house used in the final seasons of the television series Leave It to Beaver was used for exterior shots of the Hilliards' home. In 1956, Joseph Hayes won an Edgar Award from the Mystery Writers of America for Best Motion Picture Screenplay.

Plot 

Glenn Griffin is the leader of a trio of escaped convicts who invade the Hilliards' suburban home in Indianapolis and hold four family members hostage. There they await the arrival of a package, being sent by Griffin's girlfriend, that contains funds to aid the three fugitives in their escape.

Police organize a statewide manhunt for the escapees and eventually discover the distraught family's plight.  Griffin menaces and torments the Hilliards and threatens to kill them. The refuse collector, George Patterson, happens upon the situation after noticing Griffin's car in the garage. He is forced to drive into the country, then murdered by Kobish.

Hal, the younger brother of Glenn gets terrified by activities of police, suspicious boyfriend of Cindy and disagrees to stay on the house and leaves. Later, on a phone booth he shoots a police officer and tries to flee but is killed by other police officers. 

Daniel Hilliard, the family patriarch, convinces law enforcement personnel that their plan to storm the residence is too risky for his family. He then plays a trick on Griffin using an unloaded handgun, then forces him out of the house with his own weapon trained on him. Before that, Kobish is ambushed by police and FBI. Griffin is subsequently machine-gunned to death when he hurls the firearm at a police spotlight and makes a break for it.

Cast
 Humphrey Bogart as Glenn Griffin 
 Fredric March as Daniel C. Hilliard 
 Arthur Kennedy as Deputy Sheriff Jesse Bard
 Martha Scott as Ellie Hilliard 
 Dewey Martin as Hal Griffin 
 Gig Young as Chuck Wright 
 Mary Murphy as Cindy Hilliard
 Richard Eyer as Ralphy Hilliard
 Robert Middleton as Samuel Kobish
 Walter Baldwin as George Patterson
 Whit Bissell as FBI Agent Carson
 Ray Teal as State Police Lieutenant
 Ray Collins as Sheriff Masters
 Simon Oakland as State Trooper (uncredited)
 Burt Mustin as Night Watchman ("Carl") (uncredited)
 Alan Reed as Policeman ("Dutch")
 Joe Flynn as motorist (uncredited)
 Beverly Garland as Miss Swift

Background

Actual events that took place on September 11 and 12 in 1952, wherein the five members of the Hill family were held hostage for 19 hours, inspired the 1954 Joseph Hayes novel which, in turn, inspired the 1955 play on which the movie was based. The Hill family (formerly of Whitemarsh, Pennsylvania) sued Time, Inc., because Life magazine published an article in the February 1955 issue about the play, describing it as based on the actual events. The article was illustrated by staged photos with actors in the actual home that was the scene of the events, the Hills having moved away, making efforts to discourage publicity. The Hills' complaint was that the article falsely described the actual events while claiming it represented the truth. Immediately following the home invasion event, Mr. Hill had told the press the family had not been molested or harmed, and in fact had been treated courteously. The Life article, however, stated that some family members had been assaulted, profanity used, and in other ways – according to a New York appellate court – differed from the account Hill had given. Suing in a New York court, the plaintiffs relied on a New York statute which permitted damages suits for violation of the right of privacy only in instances of use of a person's name or picture for commercial purposes without consent. The statute, however, had been interpreted by the New York courts to make the truth of the publication a defense. The defense for Time, Inc., was that the matter was of general interest and the article had been published in good faith. A jury awarded compensatory and punitive damages, but the state appellate court awarded a new trial at which only compensatory damages could be considered, while sustaining liability. This order was affirmed by the highest state court.

Time, Inc., appealed the case to the United States Supreme Court, which ruled that the First Amendment prohibited holding the publisher liable unless the article was known by it to be false, or at least was published with disregard as to its truth or falsity (i.e., recklessly). The jury had not been so instructed, so the judgment could not stand. This ruling was a significant expansion of press protection, for a (qualified) immunity from damages was being extended to publishing matter about people who were newsworthy only by accident, as opposed to, for example, government officials. To this point the relevant cases had only dealt with such so-called "public figures" who were suing publishers. Mr. Hill was represented in the High Court by Richard M. Nixon, at that time an attorney in private practice.  The Supreme Court thus made it extremely difficult even for ordinarily private persons to prevail in a defamation or "false light" invasion of privacy case. From the Supreme Court, the case was sent back in 1967, to the New York courts for disposition under this newly announced constitutional standard, probably involving a new trial, or perhaps summary judgment rendered on the basis of affidavits and depositions.

Remakes
The movie was remade in 1990 as Desperate Hours, starring Mickey Rourke, Anthony Hopkins, Mimi Rogers, Kelly Lynch, Lindsay Crouse and David Morse. The remake, directed by Michael Cimino, received poor reviews.

The 1994 black comedy film The Ref also features a similar plot, with a criminal on the lam (Denis Leary) taking a couple (Kevin Spacey and Judy Davis) hostage in their own home.

The film was also remade in India as the Hindi film 36 Ghante (1974).

See also 
 List of films featuring home invasions
 List of American films of 1955

References
Footnotes

Citations

External links 
 
 
 
 

1955 films
1955 crime drama films
American crime thriller films
American black-and-white films
Edgar Award-winning works
Films scored by Gail Kubik
Films based on American novels
American films based on plays
Films directed by William Wyler
Films scored by Daniele Amfitheatrof
Films set in Indianapolis
Paramount Pictures films
Films based on multiple works
Home invasions in film
Films about hostage takings
American crime drama films
1950s crime thriller films
1950s English-language films
1950s American films